"Heartbeat - It's a Lovebeat" is a 1973 single by the Canadian group The DeFranco Family. It was the title track of their first album and the group's debut single.

Charts
The song was a success in the United States and Canada. It reached number three in both nations, as well as reaching number six in Australia. It was their highest ranking song, and it became a gold record in the US.  Were it not for Carly Simon's "You're So Vain", "Heartbeat" would have been the #1 song for 1973 on WLS, having racked up five consecutive weeks at #1 there, from 20 October through 17 November.

Weekly charts

Year-end charts

Television appearances
"Heartbeat - It's a Lovebeat" was performed multiple times on various television programs, including The Mike Douglas Show, The Sonny & Cher Comedy Hour, Jack Benny's Second Farewell Show, American Bandstand, and Dinah!

Cover versions
A cover of this song appears as a bonus track on the Deluxe Edition of The Replacements' album Let It Be.

See also
List of Cash Box Top 100 number-one singles of 1973

References

External links
 

1973 songs
1973 singles
20th Century Fox Records singles
The DeFranco Family songs
Cashbox number-one singles